William Wellington Corlett (April 10, 1842 – July 22, 1890) was a Delegate from the Territory of Wyoming.

Biography
Corlett was born April 10, 1842 in Concord, Ohio. He attended the district schools and graduated from the Willoughby (Ohio) Collegiate Institute in 1861.

Civil War service
With the outbreak of the Civil War, he enlisted in the Union Army in 1862 and served in the 28th Ohio Infantry and the 87th Ohio Infantry (a three-month regiment). He was captured with the regiment at the Battle of Harpers Ferry on September 15, 1862.

Postbellum
He was paroled and returned to Ohio, where he taught school in Kirkland and Painesville. Corlett reentered the army with the Twenty-fifth Ohio Battery. He was later placed on detached service with the Third Iowa Battery. He returned to Ohio in 1865 and mustered out of the army.

He attended law school at the University of Michigan at Ann Arbor and graduated from Union Law College of Cleveland, Ohio, in July 1866.

He was admitted to the bar the same year and became a professor in elementary law at the State University and Law College as well as lecturer at several commercial colleges in Cleveland.

He settled in Cheyenne, Wyoming in 1867, and engaged in the practice of law. During some of time in Wyoming, his law partner was John Alden Riner, who later served as a federal judge. Corlett was an unsuccessful Republican candidate for Delegate to the Forty-first Congress in 1869.

He was Postmaster of Cheyenne in 1870, a member of the Territorial senate in 1871 and prosecuting attorney of Laramie County from 1872 to 1876.

Corlett was elected as a Republican a Delegate to the Forty-fifth Congress (March 4, 1877 – March 3, 1879)

He was not a candidate for renomination in 1878.  He resumed the practice of law and in 1879 declined the appointment as chief justice of Wyoming Territory. He served as member of the legislative council 1880-1882.

He died in Cheyenne, Wyoming, on July 22, 1890 (twelve days after Wyoming was admitted to the union as the 44th state) and was interred in Lakeview Cemetery.

References
 Retrieved on 2008-02-14

1842 births
1890 deaths
Members of the Wyoming Territorial Legislature
Delegates to the United States House of Representatives from Wyoming Territory
Wyoming Republicans
People of Ohio in the American Civil War
Union Army officers
Politicians from Cheyenne, Wyoming
University of Michigan Law School alumni
People from Painesville, Ohio
19th-century American politicians